Slam City Jam, the North American Skateboard Championships, is the longest-running skateboarding event in North America and is among the best in the world.  It debuted in Vancouver in 1994. The three-day event captures the vibrant music and lifestyle of skate culture and features pre-eminent athletes and musicians. The Pacific Coliseum on the Pacific National Exhibition fairgrounds is throwing open its doors to welcome back the three-day festival of skateboarding, lifestyle and music. It has appeared as a playable level in the video games Tony Hawk's Underground and Grind Session.

In 2006 Slam City Jam took place in Calgary, Alberta instead of Vancouver because the Pacific Coliseum was being renovated for the 2010 Winter Olympics. In Calgary the event was held in the Stampede Corral. Slam City Jam has been postponed until 2010.
Slam City Jam is in the process of developing a new international advisory board composed of pro skaters, media & industry stakeholders who will be working with organizers to rebuild Slam City Jam.
It was scheduled to return to Vancouver, British Columbia, Canada in May 2008, but it has been postponed to May 2009 for unknown reasons.

Past winners
Men's Vert

Men's Street

Women's Vert

Women's Street

External links
Slam City Jam
World Cup Skateboarding
City of Vancouver

Skateboarding competitions